H.I.G. Capital is a Miami, Florida–based private equity and alternative assets investment firm with $55 billion of equity capital under management. The firm operates a family of private equity, growth equity, credit/special situation, primary lending, syndicated credit, and real estate funds.  The company provides both debt and equity capital to small and mid-sized companies.

History

H.I.G. was founded in 1993 by Sami Mnaymneh, formerly a managing director at The Blackstone Group and Tony Tamer, previously a partner at Bain & Company.

Since its founding, H.I.G. has raised several funds, including most recently:
 H.I.G. WhiteHorse Principal Lending Fund (2020) - $1.1 billion fund focused on investing in senior secured financing solutions to primarily, off-the-run, sponsor owned companies in North America.
 H.I.G. Middle Market LBO Fund III (2019) - $3.1 billion fund focused on making private equity investments in middle market companies, primarily in North America.
 H.I.G. Bayside Loan Opportunity Fund V (Europe) - $1.5 billion fund focusing on investments in small-cap, special situation credit opportunities in Europe.
 H.I.G. Advantage Buyout Fund (2018) - $3 billion fund focused on control equity investments in more stable, higher quality companies with EBITDA between $25 million and $100 million. 
 H.I.G. Growth Buyouts & Equity Fund III (2018) - $970 million fund focused on making investments in growth buyouts, as well as structured equity, in high-growth, small-cap companies primarily in North America.
 H.I.G. WhiteHorse Direct Lending Fund and H.I.G. WhiteHorse Loan Fund (2017) - $1.1 billion fund focused on investing in tailored senior secured financing solutions to non-sponsor and sponsor owned companies in the U.S.
 H.I.G. Realty Partners III (2017) - $593 million fund  focused on value-add investments in small to mid-cap properties in the United States.
 H.I.G. Bayside Loan Opportunity Fund IV (2016) - $1.1 billion fund focused on investments in small-cap special situation credit opportunities in the United States
 H.I.G. Brazil & Latin America Partners (2016) - $740 million fund focused on private equity, buyout and growth-oriented investments in lower middle-market companies in Latin America, with a focus on Brazil
 H.I.G. Middle Market Fund II (2014) — $1.75 billion fund, focused on leveraged buyouts of middle market companies.
 H.I.G. Capital Partners V (2013) — $1.0 billion fund, focused on leveraged buyouts of small-capitalization companies
 H.I.G. European Capital Partners II (2013) — €825 EUR million fund, focused on European leveraged buyouts.
 WhiteHorse VI, Ltd (2013) — $415.5 million collateralized loan obligation (CLO) fund, focused on investing in the broadly-syndicated loan space
 H.I.G. Bayside Europe Loan Opportunity Fund III (2013) — $1.0 billion fund focused on secondary purchases of senior loans and new issue loan originations in Europe
 H.I.G. BioVentures II (2012) — $268 million fund, focused on pharmaceuticals, medical devices, and diagnostics
 H.I.G. Growth Equity Fund II, L.P. (2011) — $500 million fund, focused on strong, growth oriented small-capitalization businesses

Products
H.I.G.’s equity funds invest in management buyouts, recapitalizations and corporate carve-outs of both profitable as well as underperforming manufacturing and service businesses.

H.I.G.’s debt funds invest in senior, unitranche and junior debt financing to companies across the size spectrum, both on a primary (direct origination) basis, as well as on the secondary markets. H.I.G. is also a CLO manager, through its WhiteHorse family of vehicles, and manages a publicly traded BDC, WhiteHorse Finance.

Other H.I.G. funds invest in various real assets, including real estate and shipping.
	
According to its website, H.I.G.'s team includes more than 350 professionals. Since inception, H.I.G. has invested in and managed more than 300 companies and has a current portfolio of more than 100 companies.

Offices
The company is headquartered in Miami, and has offices in New York City, Boston, Chicago, Dallas, Los Angeles, San Francisco, and Atlanta in the United States, as well as affiliate offices in London, Hamburg, Madrid, Milan, Paris, Bogotá, Rio de Janeiro and São Paulo.

References

External links

Financial services companies established in 1993
Privately held companies based in Florida
Private equity firms of the United States
American companies established in 1993
Companies based in Miami
1993 establishments in Florida